Hitman Howie Tee (born Howard Thompson) is an English-born hip-hop DJ and producer of West Indian origin, but raised in Brooklyn NY. Howie Tee is best known for his work with U.T.F.O, Chubb Rock, Special Ed and The Real Roxanne.

Howie got his start in the early ’80s as a member of the electro hip-hop group CDIII, who released two singles on Prelude Records. Howie, along with Kangol Kid of U.T.F.O, produced the group Whistle, best known for the 1985 song "(Nothing Serious) Just Buggin'". He then became the in-house producer for New Jersey-based independent label Select Records." I Got It Made" by Special Ed and "Treat em' Right" by Chubb Rock were produced by Hitman Howie Tee. In 1991 he mixed and co-produced the Billboard #1 "I Wanna Sex You Up" by Color Me Badd. He has also had many #1 hits with Color Me Badd. He has also done remixes for Madonna, Heavy D, Maxi Priest, Little Shawn among others.

Howie mentored a teenaged Spencer Bellamy, who went on to release the underground hip-hop classic "Tried By 12" under the name East Flatbush Project.

Discography

Albums

Singles

Singles produced

References

Year of birth missing (living people)
Living people
American hip hop DJs
American hip hop record producers
Musicians from Brooklyn
Record producers from New York (state)